40+ is a British television channel that shows pornographic content on a pay-per-view basis. The channel has been owned by MG Global Entertainment (Europe) Limited since 2020 when MG acquired the channel's previous owner, Portland TV.

The channel began broadcasting on Sky in June 2000 as one of a group of channels called Red Hot TV. The channels were owned by Portland TV which also owned the pornographic subscription channel Television X. Portland TV was a division of Northern & Shell until it was sold in April 2016 in a management buy-out. The name of the group of channels was changed to Xrated in 2017, and now only a single channel remains, which is currently called 40+.

History

Red Hot TV was launched in June 2000 as a set of pornographic television channels. By 2005, 8 Channels were branded under the name including a Movie Channel. Many of these channels changed their names or closed throughout the subsequent years.

In 2007 the channels were all renamed. On 28 August 2008 Red Hot Raw and Red Hot Viewers were both removed from the Sky electronic programme guide (EPG) and their EPG slots were sold off. The slots were changed into "Pulse" timeshifts and then later sold again to other broadcasters.

In August 2009 Red Hot TV attempted to get into the record books by organizing Britain's biggest gang bang, which they named "The Great British Gang Bang".

During this time Portland TV launched some free-to-air televised sex line services that went alongside Red Hot called Filth, Cream and Skincity. These channels launched and closed several times over the course of several years. Portland TV also launched another pay-per-view channel at this time called Viewer's Wives, which was in the same section as Red Hot TV. In September 2009 the channel Xplicit Nightly (Xplicit XXX) started to have its programming supplied by Red Hot. In October 2009 an EPG slot formally belonging to Filth was used to launch Red Hot Mums after the Red Hot channels rebranded.

At the start of 2012 eight channels were broadcast by Red Hot TV, including Red Hot Fetish and Red Hot Dirty Talk. However, during that year the channels were reduced to three: Red Hot 18's, Red Hot Mums and Red Hot Amateur. In 2016 only one channel under the Red Hot name remained, as the other 2 had been renamed Xtreme Filth and Viewer's Wives. In 2017 all 3 channels were relaunched and renamed as Xrated. The Red Hot, Extreme Filth and Viewer's Wives names all remaining on Virgin Media's On-Demand service alongside other defunct adult channels until August 2017, when they were all updated to the Xrated name.

On 24 August 2017 Xrated Couples was replaced with Television X Pay-Per-Night on Sky. On the same day it was taken off of Virgin Media, and within a week the channel was replaced with TVX Pornstars.

On 30 November 2017 Xrated Hook-Ups was replaced with Television X Pay-Per Night 2. It was removed from Virgin Media in March 2018, and so only Xrated 40+ remains, which changed its name to simply 40+ on 24 April 2019.

Freeview controversy

The 2005 launch of Red Hot's digital terrestrial television channel was notable for two controversies: the company was banned from using the Freeview trademark by the Freeview consortium. It was revealed that the Xtraview Encryption System used to encrypt Red Hot could be bypassed, and the channel viewed for free on receivers with manual tuning simply by entering its PID numbers. The protection system relies entirely on security through obscurity.

Red Hot stopped broadcasting on the digital terrestrial platform on 5 September 2006, however some of its channels re-commenced on the platform in September 2007 in a shared-channel arrangement with sister Television X on channel 97.

List of channels

Current
In 2017, Portland TV launched three (now two) channels on the Sky and Virgin platforms:

Former
Red Hot Euro (Replaced with Red Hot 40+ in 2003, relaunched in 2004, finally closed sometime after)
Red Hot 40+ Wives (Renamed Red Hot 40+ in 2007)
Red Hot All Girl (Renamed Red Hot Girl Girl in 2007)
Red Hot Amateur (Renamed to Viewer's Wives in 2016)
Red Hot Climax (Closed in 2007)
Red Hot Movies (Formally Red Hot Films, Closed in 2003 and replaced with Red Hot Only 18, Relaunched in 2004 and finally closed in 2006)
Red Hot Only 18 (Closed in 2006)
Red Hot Rears (Closed in 2007)
Red Hot Wives (Closed in 2007)
Red Hot (Freeview, Closed in 2006)
Red Hot Reality (Launched in 2006, Closed in 2007)
Red Hot Raw (Launched in 2006, Closed in 2008)
Red Hot 40+ (Launched in 2004, closed a while after, relaunched in 2007, Closed in 2012)
Red Hot Gold (Launched and closed in 2007)
Red Hot Viewers (Launched in 2007, Closed in 2008)
Red Hot Just 18 (Launched in 2007, Closed in 2009)
Red Hot Double D (Launched in 2007, Renamed Red Hot TV in 2009)
Red Hot Fetish (Launched in 2007, closed in 2012)
Red Hot Girl Girl (Launched in 2007, Closed in 2009)
Filth (Free Channel, Launched in 2009 and closed and re-launched several times)
Cream (Free Channel, Launched in 2009 and closed and re-launched several times)
Viewers Wives (Launched in 2009, closed and re-launched several times and finally closed in 2017)
Skin City (Free Channel, Launched and closed in 2009, Replaced with Dirty Talk)
Red Hot TV (Launched in 2009, Renamed to Red Hot 18's in 2012)
Red Hot Mums (Launched in 2009, renamed to simply Red Hot in 2016)
Red Hot 18's (Launched in 2012, renamed to Extreme Filth in 2016)
Red Hot (Launched 2016, Closed 2017)
Extreme Filth (Launched 2016, Closed 2017)
Xrated Couples (Launched and closed in 2017, replaced with Television X Pay-Per-Night)
Xrated Hook-Ups (Launched and closed in 2017, replaced with Television X Pay-Per Night 2)

See also
 List of adult television channels
 Pornography in the United Kingdom

References

Television pornography
British pornographic television channels
Television channels and stations established in 2000
2000 establishments in the United Kingdom